National Velvet is a novel by Enid Bagnold.

National Velvet can also refer to:

National Velvet (film), a film adaptation starring Elizabeth Taylor
National Velvet (TV series), a TV adaptation
National Velvet (band), a 1980s Canadian rock band